Trickles is the first album by Steve Lacy to be released on the Italian Black Saint label. It features performances of five of Lacy's compositions by Lacy, Roswell Rudd, Kent Carter and Beaver Harris.

Reception
The Allmusic review by Scott Yanow awarded the album 4.5 stars stating "One of the early Black Saint albums, this set features a reunion between soprano saxophonist Steve Lacy and trombonist Roswell Rudd; bassist Ken Carter and drummer Beaver Harris complete the quartet. Although Lacy and Rudd had had a group 15 years earlier that exclusively played Thelonious Monk tunes, in this case they perform five of Lacy's diverse originals, stretching themselves on such tunes as "Trickles" and "Robes." The music is less melodic than expected but does have its moments of interest.".

Track listing
All compositions by Steve Lacy
 "Trickles" - 10:06
 "I Feel A Draught" - 4:11
 "The Bite" - 6:40
 "Papa's Midnite Hop" - 7:58
 "Robes" - 10:18
Recorded at Generation Sound Studios, New York on March 11 and 14, 1976

Personnel
Steve Lacy - soprano saxophone
Roswell Rudd - trombone, chimes on 5
Kent Carter - bass
Beaver Harris - drums

References

1976 albums
Steve Lacy (saxophonist) albums
Black Saint/Soul Note albums